Pratik Agnihotri (born 10 January 1994) is a Norwegian cricketer who plays for the national team. He was born in Oslo. In May 2019, he was named in Norway's squad for the Regional Finals of the 2018–19 ICC T20 World Cup Europe Qualifier tournament in Guernsey. He made his Twenty20 International (T20I) debut for Norway against Guernsey on 19 June 2019.

References

External links
 

1994 births
Living people
Norwegian cricketers
Norway Twenty20 International cricketers
Sportspeople from Oslo